Hibbertia tridentata is a species of flowering plant in the family Dilleniaceae and is only known from a single population in Arnhem Land in the Northern Territory. It is a shrub with a few wiry branches, egg-shaped to triangular leaves with the narrower end towards the base, and yellow flowers usually arranged singly in leaf axils with eighteen to twenty stamens arranged around two densely scaly carpels.

Description

Taxonomy
Hibbertia tridentata was first formally described in 2010 by Hellmut R. Toelken in the Journal of the Adelaide Botanic Gardens from a specimen collected near Maningrida in 2000. The specific epithet (tridentata) means "three-toothed", referring to the leaves.

Distribution
This hibbertia is only known from a single location where it grows on scree slopes in heath-like scrub in Arnhem Land.

Conservation status
Hibbertia tridentata is classified as "data deficient" under the Northern Territory Government Northern Territory Government Territory Parks and Wildlife Conservation Act 1976.

See also
List of Hibbertia species

References

tridentata
Flora of the Northern Territory
Plants described in 2010
Taxa named by Hellmut R. Toelken